Ekaterina "Katja" Koroleva (born March 20, 1987) is an international soccer referee for the Professional Referee Organization from the United States. 

Koroleva officiates matches in the National Women's Soccer League and the United Soccer League as a referee, and in Major League Soccer as a Video Assistant Referee. Koroleva was the referee for the 2015 NWSL final in Portland, Oregon.

In August 2016, Koroleva was appointed to be a referee at the 2016 FIFA U-17 Women's World Cup in Jordan.

In August 2018, Koroleva was appointed to referee at the 2018 FIFA U-17 Women's World Cup in Uruguay.

Koroleva was appointed to be an official at the 2019 FIFA Women's World Cup in France.

References

Living people
1987 births
American soccer referees
FIFA Women's World Cup referees
Women association football referees
Coe College alumni
American people of Russian descent
American women referees and umpires